This page lists all described species of the spider family Telemidae accepted by the World Spider Catalog :

A

Apneumonella

Apneumonella Fage, 1921
 A. jacobsoni Brignoli, 1977 — Malaysia, Indonesia (Sumatra)
 A. oculata Fage, 1921 (type) — Tanzania
 A. taitatavetaensis Zhao & Li, 2017 — Kenya

C

Cangoderces

Cangoderces Harington, 1951
 C. cameroonensis Baert, 1985 — Cameroon
 C. christae Wang & Li, 2011 — Ivory Coast
 C. globosa Wang, Li & Haddad, 2018 — South Africa
 C. koupeensis Baert, 1985 — Cameroon
 C. lewisi Harington, 1951 (type) — South Africa
 C. milani Wang & Li, 2011 — Cameroon

G

Guhua

Guhua Zhao & Li, 2017
 G. kakamegaensis Zhao & Li, 2017 (type) — Kenya

J

Jocquella

Jocquella Baert, 1980
 J. boisai Baert, 1984 — New Guinea
 J. leopoldi Baert, 1980 (type) — New Guinea

K

Kinku

Kinku Dupérré & Tapia, 2015
 K. turumanya Dupérré & Tapia, 2015 (type) — Ecuador

M

Mekonglema

Mekonglema Zhao & Li, 2020
 M. bailang Zhao & Li, 2020 (type) — China
 M. kaorao Zhao & Li, 2020 — Laos
 M. walayaku Zhao & Li, 2020 — China
 M. xinpingi (Lin & Li, 2008) — China
 M. yan Zhao & Li, 2020 — China

P

Pinelema

Pinelema Wang & Li, 2012
 P. adunca (Wang & Li, 2010) — China
 P. bailongensis Wang & Li, 2012 (type) — China
 P. bella (Tong & Li, 2008) — China (Hainan)
 P. bifida (Lin & Li, 2010) — China
 P. biyunensis (Wang & Li, 2010) — China
 P. breviseta (Tong & Li, 2008) — China (Hainan)
 P. cheni Zhao & Li, 2018 — China
 P. circularis (Tong & Li, 2008) — China
 P. claviformis (Tong & Li, 2008) — China
 P. conglobare (Lin & Li, 2010) — China
 P. cordata (Wang & Li, 2010) — China
 P. cucphongensis (Lin, Pham & Li, 2009) — Vietnam
 P. cucurbitina (Wang & Li, 2010) — China
 P. cunfengensis Zhao & Li, 2017 — China
 P. curcici Wang & Li, 2016 — China
 P. daguaiwan Zhao & Li, 2020 — China
 P. damtaoensis Zhao & Li, 2018 — Vietnam
 P. dengi (Tong & Li, 2008) — China (Hainan)
 P. dongbei (Wang & Ran, 1998) — China
 P. exiloculata (Lin, Pham & Li, 2009) — Vietnam
 P. feilong (Chen & Zhu, 2009) — China
 P. grandidens (Tong & Li, 2008) — China
 P. huobaensis Wang & Li, 2016 — China
 P. huoyan Zhao & Li, 2018 — China
 P. laensis Zhao & Li, 2018 — Vietnam
 P. liangxi (Zhu & Chen, 2002) — China
 P. lizhuang Zhao & Li, 2018 — China
 P. mikrosphaira (Wang & Li, 2010) — China
 P. nuocnutensis Zhao & Li, 2018 — Vietnam
 P. oculata (Tong & Li, 2008) — China
 P. pacchanensis Zhao & Li, 2018 — Vietnam
 P. pedati (Lin & Li, 2010) — China
 P. podiensis Zhao & Li, 2017 — China
 P. qingfengensis Zhao & Li, 2017 — China
 P. renalis (Wang & Li, 2010) — China
 P. shiba Zhao & Li, 2020 — China
 P. spina (Tong & Li, 2008) — China (Hainan)
 P. spinafemora (Lin & Li, 2010) — China
 P. spirae (Lin & Li, 2010) — China
 P. spirulata Zhao & Li, 2018 — Vietnam
 P. strentarsi (Lin & Li, 2010) — China
 P. tham Zhao & Li, 2020 — Laos
 P. tortutheca (Lin & Li, 2010) — China
 P. vesiculata (Lin & Li, 2010) — China
 P. wangshang Zhao & Li, 2018 — China
 P. wenyang Zhao & Li, 2018 — China
 P. xiezi Zhao & Li, 2018 — Vietnam
 P. xiushuiensis Wang & Li, 2016 — China
 P. yaosaensis Wang & Li, 2016 — China
 P. yashanensis (Wang & Li, 2010) — China
 P. yunchuni Zhao & Li, 2018 — China
 P. zhenzhuang Zhao & Li, 2018 — Vietnam
 P. zhewang (Chen & Zhu, 2009) — China
 P. zonaria (Wang & Li, 2010) — China

S

Seychellia

Seychellia Saaristo, 1978
 S. cameroonensis Baert, 1985 — Cameroon
 S. jeremyi Wang & Li, 2011 — Ivory Coast
 S. lodoiceae Brignoli, 1980 — Seychelles
 S. wiljoi Saaristo, 1978 (type) — Seychelles

Siamlema

Siamlema Zhao & Li, 2020
 S. changhai Zhao & Li, 2020 (type) — Thailand
 S. suea Zhao & Li, 2020 — Thailand

Sundalema

Sundalema Zhao & Li, 2020
 S. acicularis (Wang & Li, 2010) — Thailand
 S. anguina (Wang & Li, 2010) — Thailand
 S. bonjol Zhao & Li, 2020 (type) — Indonesia (Sumatra)
 S. khaorakkiat Zhao & Li, 2020 — Thailand

T

Telema

Telema Simon, 1882
 T. auricoma Lin & Li, 2010 — China
 T. guihua Lin & Li, 2010 — China
 T. mayana Gertsch, 1973 — Guatemala
 T. nipponica (Yaginuma, 1972) — Japan
 T. tenella Simon, 1882 (type) — Spain, France
 T. wunderlichi Song & Zhu, 1994 — China
 † T. moritzi Wunderlich, 2004

Telemofila

Telemofila Wunderlich, 1995
 T. fabata (Wang & Li, 2010) — Singapore
 T. malaysiaensis (Wang & Li, 2010) — Malaysia (Borneo)
 T. pecki (Brignoli, 1980) — New Caledonia
 T. samosirensis Wunderlich, 1995 (type) — Indonesia (Sumatra)
 † T. crassifemoralis Wunderlich, 2017

U

Usofila

Usofila Keyserling, 1891
 U. flava Chamberlin & Ivie, 1942 — USA
 U. gracilis Keyserling, 1891 (type) — USA
 U. oregona Chamberlin & Ivie, 1942 — USA
 U. pacifica (Banks, 1894) — USA

Z

Zhuanlema

Zhuanlema Zhao & Li, 2020
 Z. peteri Zhao & Li, 2020 (type) — Laos

References

Telemidae